Monaca is a collection of software tools and services for building and deploying HTML5 mobile hybrid apps. Built using open-source Apache Cordova (formerly known as PhoneGap), it provides resources including Cloud IDE, local development tools, a debugger, and backend support.

Overview

Monaca's cloud-based IDE builds HTML5 hybrid mobile apps for iOS, Android, Windows and Chrome Apps using HTML, CSS and, JavaScript. Multi-platform app development utilizes native language components and functionalities. Monaca is framework-agnostic, and provides integration with Onsen UI and Ionic Framework for building user interfaces.

References

External links
 Official Website

Software frameworks
IOS development software
Android (operating system) development software
JavaScript programming tools
HTML5
Cloud applications